The 1969–70 Liga Bet season saw Hapoel Nahariya,  Hapoel Zikhron Ya'akov, and Hapoel Yehud win their regional divisions and promoted to Liga Alef. Hapoel Beit Shemesh, which placed third in South Division B was also promoted, as the top two clubs, Hapoel Ramla and Hapoel Ashdod were involved in match-fixing scandal, and as a result, both clubs were disqualified by the IFA.

North Division A

Hapoel Kfar Blum withdrew from the league and folded.

North Division B

South Division A

South Division B

References
Nahariya, Zikhron, Yehud and Ramla promoted to Liga Alef Maariv, 7.6.70, Historical Jewish Press 
Hapoel Migdal HaEmek lost first point Davar, 2.2.70, Historical Jewish Press 

Liga Bet seasons
Israel
3